This is a list of radio stations operating in Austria. The Austrian regulatory agency (Kommunikationsbehörde Austria) acts as frequency assignment authority.

Austria

Public broadcasting
ORF (Österreichischer Rundfunk)
Österreich 1
Ö1 International (shortwave)
Österreich 2 - regional radio
Radio Burgenland: Burgenland
Radio Kärnten: Carinthia
Radio Niederösterreich: Lower Austria
Radio Oberösterreich: Upper Austria
Radio Salzburg: Salzburg
Radio Steiermark: Styria
Radio Tirol: Tyrol and South Tyrol
Radio Vorarlberg: Vorarlberg
Radio Wien: Vienna
Hitradio Ö3
FM4

Commercial broadcasters
Supra-regional
KroneHit
Radio Arabella network: Vienna, Lower Austria, Upper Austria, nationwide via DAB+
LoungeFM
Radio Austria (formerly Radio Ö24 and Antenne Wien, Fellner Group)
Antenne Österreich network (Fellner Group)
Antenne Austria
Antenne Salzburg
Antenne Tirol
Welle 1 network: Salzburg, Linz/Wels, Graz, Carinthia (former Radio Harmonie)
NRJ Group network: Vienna, Salzburg, Tyrol, nationwide via DAB+
Regional
Vienna and Lower Austria
Radio 88.6
98.3 superfly
Radio Stephansdom, operated by the Archdiocese of Vienna
Carinthia
Antenne Kärnten (Styria Media Group)
Radio Real, Radenthein
Radio Uno, Klagenfurt
Salzburg
Antenne Salzburg
Radio Alpina
Styria
Antenne Steiermark (Styria Media Group)
Njoy Radio
Radio Soundportal
Radio Grün-Weiß
Radio Eins
Tyrol
Antenne Tirol
Welle 1 (Innsbruck)
Klassik Radio
Life Radio
Radio Osttirol (East Tyrol, former Radio Grizzly)
U1 Radio Unterland
Energy 99.9 (NRJ Group)
Upper Austria
Life Radio
Vorarlberg
Antenne Vorarlberg

Community stations
Radio Maria Austria
Community radio stations organised in the Verband Freier Radios Österreich (VFRÖ) organisation:
Radio AGORA (Klagenfurt)
B138 (Kirchdorf an der Krems)
Campus & City Radio (St. Pölten)
Radio Freequenns (Liezen)
Freies Radio Innsbruck (Innsbruck)
Freies Radio Freistadt (Freistadt)
Radio FRO 105.0 (Linz) 
Freies Radio Salzkammergut (Bad Ischl)
radio Ypsilon (Hollabrunn)
Radio Helsinki (Graz)
Orange 94.0 (Vienna)
Radio Proton (Dornbirn)
Radiofabrik 107,5 (Salzburg)
Radio OP (Oberpullendorf)
Campus radio stations
Campus & City Radio (University of Applied Sciences, Sankt Pölten)
Radius 106,6 (Gymnasium Freistadt)

Former stations
 Rot-Weiß-Rot and Blue Danube Network, operated by the US Forces in Austria 1945–1955
 Radio Österreich International (1955–2003, today Radio Ö1 International)
 Blue Danube Radio (1979–2000, nationwide from 1992)
 Radio 1476 (1997–2008)
 Ö1 Inforadio (internet, until April 2011)

See also
Media of Austria

References
 Radio stations in the biggest cities in Austria (Radiomap.eu)
 Radio stations in Vaduz, Liechtenstein (Radiomap.eu)

Austria
 
Radio in Liechtenstein